Isakovo is a rural locality (a village) in Lavrovskoye Rural Settlement, Sudogodsky District, Vladimir Oblast, Russia. The population was 15 as of 2010. There are two streets.

Geography 
Isakovo is located on the Sudogda River, 22 km north of Sudogda (the district's administrative centre) by road. Trukhachevo is the nearest rural locality.

References 

Rural localities in Sudogodsky District